Solomiia Vynnyk is a Ukrainian freestyle wrestler. In 2020, at the European Wrestling Championships held in Rome, Italy, she won the silver medal in the women's 55 kg event. In the final, she lost against Olga Khoroshavtseva of Russia.

Career 

In 2019, she competed in the women's freestyle event of the 2019 Wrestling World Cup.

She won one of the bronze medals in her event at the 2021 European U23 Wrestling Championship held in Skopje, North Macedonia.

In October 2021, she lost her bronze medal match in the women's 57 kg event at the World Wrestling Championships in Oslo, Norway. A month later, at the 2021 U23 World Wrestling Championships held in Belgrade, Serbia, she won the silver medal in the 59 kg event.

In 2022, she competed in the 59 kg event at the European Wrestling Championships held in Budapest, Hungary. A few months later, she competed at the Matteo Pellicone Ranking Series 2022 held in Rome, Italy. She competed in the 59 kg event at the 2022 World Wrestling Championships held in Belgrade, Serbia where she was eliminated in her first match. A month later, she won one of the bronze medals in 59kg event at the 2022 U23 World Wrestling Championships held in Pontevedra, Spain.

She won the gold medal in her event at the 2023 European U23 Wrestling Championships held in Bucharest, Romania.

Achievements

References

External links 

 

Living people
Year of birth missing (living people)
Place of birth missing (living people)
Ukrainian female sport wrestlers
European Wrestling Championships medalists
21st-century Ukrainian women